Aspidoscelis scalaris, the rusty-rumped whiptail, is a species of teiid lizard found in Mexico and the United States (Texas).

References

scalaris
Reptiles described in 1892
Taxa named by Edward Drinker Cope
Reptiles of the United States
Reptiles of Mexico